Adrian Pecknold (1920–1999) was a Canadian mime, director, and author of the book Mime: The Step Beyond Words.  He is popularly known for his creation and depiction of Poco the Clown in the popular Canadian children's television program Mr. Dressup.

Pecknold studied mime at L'École Jacques Lecoq in Paris from October 1962 to April 1963. Following this, he joined Toronto Workshop Productions as an actor and instructor of mime.

In 1968, he founded Canada's first professional mime company, the Canadian Mime Theatre, in Niagara-on-the-Lake. In 1974 he began the Canadian Mime School, the first Canadian professional mime school. From 1982 to 1988 he taught at the University of Guelph, and from 1982 to 1999  he taught at the Ryerson Theatre School, Ryerson Polytechnical Institute, in Toronto, Ontario, Canada.

Awards and honors 
Pecknold was awarded the Queen's Silver Jubilee Medal in 1977 in recognition of his contribution to theatre and theatre education in Canada.

References
 Pecknold, Adrian. (1982). Mime: The Step Beyond Words. Beaverbooks.
(1998). Carte Blanche. The Canadian Mime Theatre: A Thirty-Year Retrospective. Canadian Theatre Review, Issue 96.

Canadian mimes
1920 births
1999 deaths
L'École Internationale de Théâtre Jacques Lecoq alumni
Canadian expatriates in France